Paul de Krom (born 10 February 1963) is a Dutch business executive and former politician of the People's Party for Freedom and Democracy (VVD). He has been CEO and Chairman of the Organisation for Applied Scientific Research since 1 March 2015, and CEO and Chairman of the Energy Research Centre since 1 April 2018. He has also served as Chairman of the Distribution association since 3 April 2018.

De Krom was elected as a Member of the House of Representatives after the election of 2003, he served in the House of Representatives from 30 January 2003 until 14 October 2010. After the election of 2010 De Krom was appointed as State Secretary for Social Affairs and Employment in the Cabinet Rutte I, serving from 14 October 2010 until 5 November 2012.

After the fall of the Cabinet Rutte I De Krom announced his semi-retirement from national politics and didn't stand for the election of 2012.

Decorations

References

External links

Official
  Drs. P. (Paul) de Krom Parlement & Politiek

 

 

 

1963 births
Living people
Dutch academic administrators
Dutch corporate directors
Dutch expatriates in the United Arab Emirates
Dutch expatriates in the United Kingdom
Dutch human resource management people
Dutch management consultants
Dutch nonprofit directors
Dutch nonprofit executives
Dutch trade association executives
HU University of Applied Sciences Utrecht
Knights of the Order of Orange-Nassau
Members of the House of Representatives (Netherlands)
People from Zutphen
People's Party for Freedom and Democracy politicians
Shell plc people
State Secretaries for Social Affairs of the Netherlands
University of Groningen alumni
20th-century Dutch businesspeople
20th-century Dutch civil servants
21st-century Dutch businesspeople
21st-century Dutch civil servants
21st-century Dutch politicians